I Have Dreamed may refer to:

 "I Have Dreamed" (song), a song by Rodgers and Hammerstein from the musical The King and I
 I Have Dreamed (Doris Day album), an album by Doris Day
 I Have Dreamed (The Lettermen album), an album by The Lettermen

See also
 I Have a Dream (disambiguation)